Vellarikka Pattanam is a 1985 Indian Malayalam film,  directed and produced by Thomas Berly. The film stars Prem Nazir, Sukumari, Jagathy Sreekumar and Manavalan Joseph in the lead roles. It is the last film where Prem Nazir appears as a hero. The film has musical score by Thomas Berly.

Plot
The night of the funeral of their father, Kuriakose, brothers Alex and Stephen are attacked by goons at their home. They escape via different routes - Alex impersonates a drunk political leader while Stephen hides out in a nunnery. The mystery deepens when Stephen finds another man, Thomas Kuruvilla, who bears a striking resemblance to their father and died under similar circumstances only a day earlier.

Cast

Prem Nazir as Alex
Sukumari
Jagathy Sreekumar as Porinju
Manavalan Joseph as Sub Inspector Hitlar Jose
Ratheesh as Stephen
Shubha as Sathyabhama
Prathapachandran as Kuriakose / Thomas Kuruvilla
C. P. Antony
Kundara Johnny as Muthu
Lalithasree as Mariyamma
Mala Aravindan
Philomina
Sabitha Anand as Shobha
Seema Sophie
Thodupuzha Vasanthi
Thrissur Elsy

Soundtrack
The music was composed by Thomas Berly and the lyrics were written by Nelson.

References

External links
 

1985 films
1980s Malayalam-language films